La Prele Work Center is a  work center located in Medicine Bow National Forest near Douglas, Wyoming. The building was constructed from 1937 to 1941 by the Civilian Conservation Corps. The log building was designed by U.S. Forest Service architects in a rustic style distinct to the USFS. The building originally served as a ranger station for the La Prele Ranger District and was called the Cold Springs Ranger Station. In 1941, the station was renamed the La Prele Ranger Station. The building served as a ranger station until the La Prele district was consolidated in 1956; it is now a work center for U.S. Forest Service work crews.

The building was added to the National Register of Historic Places in 1994.

References

External links

United States Forest Service architecture
Park buildings and structures on the National Register of Historic Places in Wyoming
Government buildings completed in 1937
Buildings and structures in Converse County, Wyoming
Historic districts on the National Register of Historic Places in Wyoming
National Register of Historic Places in Converse County, Wyoming
1937 establishments in Wyoming
Medicine Bow National Forest